The Church of the Holy Apostles is an historic Carpenter Gothic Episcopal church located at 1706 Hagood Avenue in Barnwell, South Carolina. On April 13, 1972, it was added to the National Register of Historic Places as the Church of the Holy Apostles, Episcopal.

History
The Church of the Holy Apostles was organized on November 18, 1848. The church was built in 1856 and dedicated on March 11, 1857, The cemetery adjacent to the church dates from the same time. Burials include Johnson Hagood, a confederate general in the Second Battle of Fort Wagner where Robert Gould Shaw was killed leading the all-black 54th Massachusetts regiment, a defeat portrayed in the 1989 film Glory.

Current use
The Church of the Holy Apostles is still an active parish in the Anglican Church in North America's Diocese of South Carolina. The Rev. Robert Horn is the current rector.

See also

List of Registered Historic Places in South Carolina

References

External links
 
 National Register listings for Barnwell County
 Church of the Holy Apostles history
 South Carolina Department of Archives and History file on Church of the Holy Apostles, Episcopal

Churches on the National Register of Historic Places in South Carolina
Holy Apostles
Holy Apostles
Cemeteries in South Carolina
Churches in Barnwell County, South Carolina
19th-century Episcopal church buildings
National Register of Historic Places in Barnwell County, South Carolina
Anglican Church in North America church buildings in the United States
Former Episcopal church buildings in South Carolina
Anglican realignment congregations